is a passenger railway station in located in the town of Ōdai, Taki District, Mie Prefecture, Japan, operated by Central Japan Railway Company (JR Tōkai).

Lines
Takihara Station is served by the Kisei Main Line, and is located 73.0 rail kilometers from the terminus of the line at Kameyama Station.

Station layout
The station consists of two opposed side platforms, connected by a footbridge. The station is unattended.

Platforms

History 
Takihara Station opened on 18 August 1926 as a station on the Japanese Government Railways (JGR) Kisei-East Line. The line was extended on to Ise-Kashiwazaki Station on 3 July 1927. The JGR became the Japan National Railways (JNR) after World War II, and the line was renamed the Kisei Main Line on 15 July 1959. The station has been unattended since 21 December 1983. The station was absorbed into the JR Central network upon the privatization of the JNR on 1 April 1987.

Passenger statistics
In fiscal 2019, the station was used by an average of 37 passengers daily (boarding passengers only).

Surrounding area
Taiki Town Hall
Takiharanomiya-Ise Jingu Bekkyu.
Kumano Kodo Iseji

See also
List of railway stations in Japan

References

External links

  JR Central timetable 

Railway stations in Japan opened in 1926
Railway stations in Mie Prefecture
Ōdai